Zephirium is a titular Bishopric of the Roman Catholic Church located in Cilicia.

There are five known bishops of the Seat.

Hypatus, attended the Council of Chalcedon.
Zenobus, an associate of Theodoret of Cyrrhus
Jean-Jacques Crouzet (1 Oct 1888 Appointed - 8 Jan 1933).
Antonin Eltschkner (10 Feb 1933 Appointed - 22 Feb 1961) 
André  Collini  (7 Sep 1962 Appointed - 26 Jul 1966)

References

Catholic titular sees in Asia